Marcel van der Merwe (born 24 October 1990) is a South African rugby union footballer. His regular playing position is prop. He represents  in the English Premiership Rugby.

In June 2016, Van der Merwe joined French Top 14 side  on a two-year deal.

Representative rugby

In May 2014, Van der Merwe was one of eight uncapped players that were called up to a Springbok training camp prior to the 2014 mid-year rugby union tests.

South Africa 'A'

In 2016, Van der Merwe was included in a South Africa 'A' squad that played a two-match series against a touring England Saxons team. He didn't play in their first match in Bloemfontein, but started the second match of the series, a 26–29 defeat in George.

Springbok statistics

Test Match Record 

Pld = Games Played, W = Games Won, D = Games Drawn, L = Games Lost, Tri = Tries Scored, Con = Conversions, Pen = Penalties, DG = Drop Goals, Pts = Points Scored

References

External links

Marcel van der Merwe at itsrugby.co.uk

1990 births
Living people
Afrikaner people
Alumni of Grey College, Bloemfontein
Blue Bulls players
Bulls (rugby union) players
Cheetahs (rugby union) players
Free State Cheetahs players
London Irish players
RC Toulonnais players
Rugby union players from Welkom
Rugby union props
South Africa international rugby union players
South Africa Under-20 international rugby union players
South African people of Dutch descent
South African rugby union players
Stade Rochelais players